Raj Chandra Bose (19 June 1901 – 31 October 1987) was an Indian American mathematician and statistician best known for his work in design theory, finite geometry and the theory of error-correcting codes in which the class of BCH codes is partly named after him. He also invented the notions of partial geometry, association scheme, and strongly regular graph and started a systematic study of difference sets to construct symmetric block designs. 
He was notable for his work along with S. S. Shrikhande and E. T. Parker in their disproof of the famous conjecture made by Leonhard Euler dated 1782 that there do not exist two mutually orthogonal Latin squares of order 4n + 2 for every n.

Early life
Bose was born in Hoshangabad, India; he was the first of five children. His father was a physician and life was good until 1918 when his mother died in the influenza pandemic. His father died of a stroke the following year. Despite difficult circumstances, Bose continued to study securing first class in both the Masters examinations in Pure and Applied mathematics in 1925 and 1927 respectively at the Rajabazar Science College campus of University of Calcutta. His research was performed under the supervision of the geometry Professor Syamadas Mukhopadhyaya from Calcutta. Bose worked as a lecturer at Asutosh College, Calcutta. He published his work on the differential geometry of convex curves.

Academic life
Bose's course changed in December 1932 when P. C. Mahalanobis, director of the new (1931) Indian Statistical Institute, offered Bose a part-time job. Mahalanobis had seen Bose's geometrical work and wanted him to work on statistics. The day after Bose moved in, the secretary brought him all the volumes of Biometrika with a list of 50 papers to read and also Ronald Fisher's Statistical Methods for Research Workers. Mahalanobis told him, "You were saying that you do not know much statistics. You master the 50 papers ... and Fisher's book. This will suffice for your statistical education for the present." With Samarendra Nath Roy, who joined the ISI a little later, Bose was the chief mathematician at the Institute.

He first worked with multivariate analysis where he collaborated with Mahalanobis and Roy. In 1938–9 Fisher visited India and talked about the design of experiments. Roy had the idea of using the theory of finite fields and finite geometry to solve problems in design. The development of a mathematical theory of design would be Bose's main preoccupation until the mid-1950s.

In 1935 Bose had become full-time at the Institute. In 1940 joined the University of Calcutta where C. R. Rao and H. K. Nandi were in the first group of students he taught. In 1945 Bose became Head of the Department of Statistics.
University authorities in the United States told him he needed to have a doctorate. So he submitted his published papers on multivariate analysis and the design of experiments and was awarded a D. Litt. in 1947.

In 1947 Bose went to the United States as a visiting professor at Columbia University and the University of North Carolina at Chapel Hill. He received offers from American universities and he was also offered positions in India. The Indian jobs involved very heavy administration, which he saw as the end of his research work and in March 1949 he joined the University of North Carolina at Chapel Hill as Professor of Statistics.

In the years at Chapel Hill Bose made important discoveries on coding theory (with D.K. Ray-Chaudhuri) and constructed (with S. S. Shrikhande and E. T. Parker) a Graeco-Latin square of size 10, a counterexample to Euler's conjecture that no Graeco-Latin square of size 4k + 2 exists. In 1971, he retired at the age of 70. He then accepted a chair at Colorado State University of Fort Collins from which he retired in 1980. His final doctoral student finished after this second retirement.

Bose died in Colorado, aged 86, in 1987. He is survived by two daughters. The elder, Purabi Schur, is retired from the Library of Congress and the younger, Sipra Bose Johnson, is retired as a professor of anthropology from the State University of New York at New Paltz.

Some articles by R. C. Bose
R. C. Bose, On the construction of balanced incomplete block designs, Annals of Eugenics. 9 (1939), 358–399.
R. C. Bose and K. R. Nair, Partially balanced incomplete block designs, Sankhya 4 (1939), 337–372.
 
R. C. Bose and S. S. Shrikhande, On the falsity of Euler's conjecture about the non-existence of two orthogonal Latin squares of order 4t + 2, Proceedings of the National Academy of Sciences USA, 45, (1959), 734–737.
R. C. Bose and D.K. Ray-Chaudhuri On a class of error-correcting binary codes, Information and control, 3, (1960), 68–79.

Autobiography
J. Gani (ed) (1982) The Making of Statisticians, New York: Springer-Verlag.
This has a chapter in which Bose tells the story of his life.

Discussions
Norman R. Draper (1990) Obituary: Raj Chandra Bose, Journal of the Royal Statistical Society Series A, Vol. 153, No. 1. pp. 98–99.
"Bose, Raj Chandra", pp. 183–184 in Leading Personalities in Statistical Sciences from the Seventeenth Century to the Present,  (ed. N. L. Johnson and S. Kotz) 1997. New York: Wiley. Originally p''

See also
 Association scheme
 Block design
 Bose–Mesner algebra
 Combinatorial design
 Design of experiments

External links
 R. C. Bose:another photograph on the Portraits of Statisticians page.
 Indian Statistical Institute: useful background information
 
 Peter Cameron's Quotes on Mathematics: where the story about fields comes from
  
 

1901 births
1987 deaths
Indian emigrants to the United States
Indian statisticians
Information theorists
Bengali mathematicians
Bengali Hindus
Colorado State University faculty
University of North Carolina at Chapel Hill faculty
Latin squares
University of Calcutta alumni
Academic staff of the University of Calcutta
Presidents of the Institute of Mathematical Statistics
People from Hoshangabad
Fellows of the American Statistical Association
Academic staff of the Indian Statistical Institute
American academics of Indian descent
20th-century Indian mathematicians
Scientists from Kolkata
Members of the United States National Academy of Sciences